Brightness temperature or radiance temperature is the temperature at which a black body in thermal equilibrium with its surroundings would have to be in order to duplicate the observed intensity of a grey body object at a frequency .
This concept is used in radio astronomy, planetary science and materials science. 

The brightness temperature of a surface is typically determined by an optical measurement, for example using a pyrometer, with the intention of determining the real temperature. As detailed below, the real temperature of a surface can in some cases be calculated by dividing the brightness temperature by the emissivity of the surface. Since the emissivity is a value between 0 and 1, the real temperature will be greater than or equal to the brightness temperature. At high frequencies (short wavelengths) and low temperatures, the conversion must proceed through Planck's law.

The brightness temperature is not a temperature as ordinarily understood. It characterizes radiation, and depending on the mechanism of radiation can differ considerably from the physical temperature of a radiating body (though it is theoretically possible to construct a device which will heat up by a source of radiation with some brightness temperature to the actual temperature equal to brightness temperature). Nonthermal sources can have very high brightness temperatures.

For a black body, Planck's law gives:

where

For a grey body the  spectral radiance is a portion of the black body radiance, determined by the emissivity .
That makes the reciprocal of the brightness temperature:

At low frequency and high temperatures, when , we can use the Rayleigh–Jeans law:

so that the brightness temperature can be simply written as:

The brightness temperature can be used to calculate the spectral index of a body, in the case of non-thermal radiation.

Calculating by frequency 
The brightness temperature of a source with known spectral radiance can be expressed as:

 

When  we can use the Rayleigh–Jeans law:
 

For narrowband radiation with very low relative spectral linewidth  and known radiance  we can calculate the brightness temperature as:

Calculating by wavelength 
Spectral radiance of black-body radiation is expressed by wavelength as:
 

So, the brightness temperature can be calculated as:
 

For long-wave radiation  the brightness temperature is:
 

For almost monochromatic radiation, the brightness temperature can be expressed by the radiance  and the coherence length :

References

Temperature
Radio astronomy
Planetary science